The Killing Dance is a horror/mystery novel by American writer Laurell K. Hamilton, the sixth book in the Anita Blake: Vampire Hunter series.

Plot introduction 
The Killing Dance continues the adventures of Anita Blake.  In the novel, Anita continues to explore her relationship with her two romantic interests, Richard, a werewolf, and Jean-Claude, a vampire, while attempting to resolve an assortment of conflicts ranging from werewolf politics to unsolved murders.  As with its predecessors, The Killing Dance blends elements of supernatural, hardboiled and police procedural fiction. The Killing Dance also marks Hamilton's first significant introduction of elements of erotic fiction into her genre fusion.

Explanation of the title
The werewolves in the novel refer to both sex and dominance fights (particularly the fight to become Ulfric which must end in either the death of the current Ulfric or the death of the challenger) as "the killing dance."  This represented a slight variation on Hamilton's practice of naming the novels after a fictional location within each novel for most of the Anita Blake series.

Plot summary
The Killing Dance takes place in May, about a month and a half after Bloody Bones and like the previous novels, The Killing Dance begins with a potential job for Anita in her role as an Animators, Inc. employee.  In this case, Anita and Jean-Claude are in Anita's office meeting with Sabin, a master vampire, and with Dominic Dumare, Sabin's human servant.  Sabin and Dumare explain that Sabin, in order to please a mortal lover, promised to abstain from feeding on the blood of live humans.  As a result, he has developed a condition in which his body is irreversibly rotting away, and is beginning to lose control of his powers.  Dumare, a necromancer, believes that if he and Anita join their abilities and his experience, they may be able to cure Sabin, and Anita agrees to help if possible.  Jean-Claude and Anita ponder the parallels between Sabin's relationship with his unnamed mortal love and their own romantic relationship, and Anita leaves for a date with her other boyfriend, Richard.  (Although Jean-Claude, a vampire, is in the process of consolidating his leadership of the city, Richard is locked in an ongoing struggle for leadership of the werewolves of the city with their current Ulfric, Marcus, primarily because Richard, unlike Jean-Claude, is not willing to kill in order to assume or maintain power.)

Anita and Richard go to a dinner party at Anita's friend Catherine's house.  There, they meet one of Jean-Claude's vampires, Robert, and his wife, Monica.  Monica announces that she is pregnant, which Anita had previously thought impossible for a vampire of Robert's age.  Monica is also very friendly with Anita, notwithstanding her assistance in the plot to hyponize Catherine and blackmail Anita in Guilty Pleasures.  Anita wonders if Jean-Claude deliberately planned for Robert to attend the party to spy on her and Richard.  She and Richard are forced to leave the party early after she receives a call from Edward.  Edward, one of the world's premier assassins and a sort of friend of Anita's, tells Anita that he has received a proposed contract to kill Anita.  He has refused, but wants her to get home and begin making plans to protect herself while he investigates the identity of the person putting out the contract on her life.

Anita and Richard arrive at her house and meet Mrs. Pringle.  Anita suspects that someone is in her apartment, and, while Richard helps Mrs. Pringle move a television, she engages in a gun battle through her closed front door, ultimately killing Jimmy Dugan, a local thug known as "Jimmy the Shotgun".  Anita is taken to police headquarters and questioned for quite some time by Detective Branswell, who eventually lets her go.  Anita and Richard argue about her decision to confront Jimmy the Shotgun without asking Richard to back her up, and Anita agrees to move into Richard's house for the time being in order to protect her neighbors from any potential collateral damage.

Edward contacts Anita at Richard's house and tells her that the contract on her life has been increased to $500,000 if the murder is performed within 24 hours.  Edward suggests that Anita try to deduce the identity of the person offering the contract by figuring out who would need her dead that quickly, but she doesn't have any ideas.  Richard then receives a call from Stephen.  Stephen is being forced to participate in one of Raina's pornographic movies, and is desperate for Richard's protection.  Richard and Anita leave to rescue him.

At the farmhouse where Raina shoots her movies, Richard and Anita confront several werewolves and various crew members.  Richard reassures Heidi, a non-dominant werewolf trapped in the middle of the conflict between Marcus and himself.  One of the werewolves, Sebastian challenges Richard, but Richard easily subdues him with the raw power of his beast.  Approximately 30 werewolves gang up on Richard, including Sebastian and Jamil, and Anita realizes that the situation was a trap to kill him.  She goes to rescue Stephen while Richard holds off the wolves.

Anita follows the sounds of Stephen's screams and finds a room where Stephen is being tortured on film by his brother Gregory while being restrained by Raina and Gabriel.  Anita removes Stephen and finds Richard fighting off the twenty werewolves outside the filming room.  She and Richard confront the wolves, and Anita realizes that because the wolves do not believe Richard is willing to kill, they are not afraid of him.  She threatens to kill Raina if anyone uses Stephen in a film again, setting herself up as a challenger for Raina's position as the pack's lupa.  After returning to Richard's home, Richard stays awake as guard while Stephen sleeps in Anita's bed for protection.

Later morning, Anita wakes to find Jason, Sylvie and Lillian at Richard's house.  Lillian tends wounds while Jason and Sylvie attempt to convince Richard that he must be willing to kill to lead the pack.  Anita and Richard go to a separate room to argue and come close to having sex, only to be interrupted by the weres on the other side of the door.  Anita worries that her relationship with Richard makes her vulnerable, because unlike Jean-Claude, Anita can't count on Richard to make the hard decisions necessary to survive.

Anita leaves the bedroom to find that several more shapeshifters have arrived—Rafael, Christine, and about fifteen others.  She learns that Jean-Claude and many of the city's shapeshifters support Richard's attempt to dethrone Marcus as Ulfric, but that as long as Richard is not willing to kill, his claim is weakened.  Richard ultimately declares Anita as his lupa and declares himself willing to kill Marcus if necessary to assume control of the pack.  In order to assume a dominant role within the pack, Anita is forced to fight Neal, one of the werewolves present until first blood is drawn.  She maneuvers him into a position where she can judo throw him through a window, drawing blood.

As Neal cleans himself off, Edward arrives.  Edward thinks that whichever assassin accepted the contract will try to kill Anita during her date with Jean-Claude at the opening of Dance Macabre, Jean-Claude's new club.  Over Richard's objections, he and Anita make plans to use Anita as bait to draw out the assassin.

Jean-Claude and Anita arrive at the club and are mobbed by reporters, "outing" Anita as the vampire's girlfriend.  Under pressure from Jean-Claude, Anita admits that she wanted to keep their relationship secret and that her desire to do so was unfair to Jean-Claude.  Anita meets Liv and Damian, two new and powerful vampires in Jean-Claude's retinue, as well as Cassandra, a new addition to the Thronos Rokke clan of werewolves.  During the floorshow, Anita is forced to intervene to stop Damian from permanently hypnotizing one of the guests.  Anita helps the guest into the women's bathroom with the help of another patron, Anabelle Smith.  Smith draws a gun on Anita, but is distracted when some women enter, allowing Anita enough time to draw a knife and kill her.  The police arrive and arrest Anita for the second time in two days.

Detective Greeley does his best to get Anita to talk, but Dolph ultimately convinces Greeley to turn Anita over to Dolph by telling Greeley that Anita is a suspect in other crime.  Dolph takes Anita to a suburban home in Creve Coeur, and shows Anita the crime scene—one of Jean-Claude's vampire's, Robert has been staked out inside a magic circle and ritually killed.  Anita, as a necromancer, is unable to cross the circle, which was designed to block the magic of the dead.  She hypothesizes that the circle was used to prevent Jean-Claude from learning of Roberts' death, and meets Tammy Reynolds, a new member of RPIT.  Anita guesses that the crime must have been performed by at least two supernatural beings with enough strength to restrain Robert, in addition to someone with sufficiently detailed knowledge of necromancy to perform the ritual.  Because even John Burke and Anita herself lack the expertise to perform the ritual, Anita tells Dolph that Dominic Dumare is the only suspect she can identify.  Anita and Dolph clash over what she can tell Jean-Claude about Robert's death and about whether her loyalties now lie with Jean-Claude or with RPIT.

After some more investigation, Anita accompanies Robert's widow, Monica to the hospital.  While at the hospital, Anita speaks to Edward, who tells her that the contract on her life has been extended another twenty-four hours and convinces her to take cover in the Circus of the Damned while he attempts to identify who is behind the hit.

At the Circus, Anita tells Jean-Claude about Robert's death and learns for the first time about Jean-Claude's past with Asher and Julianna.  Jean-Claude tells Anita that Asher has petitioned the Vampire Council for permission to kill Anita as revenge for Julianna's death.  Later, Jean-Claude and Anita discuss their relationship, both with each other and with Richard.  Jean-Claude tells Anita that he loves her, and promises not to stand in her way if she chooses Richard, but demands that she see Richard change into a wolf before committing.  They kiss, and Richard enters.  With Richard's control weakened by the approaching full moon, Jean-Claude baits Richard and Richard knocks Anita down in the course of attacking Jean-Claude.
 
Jean-Claude leaves to prepare for the approaching dawn, and Richard and Anita discuss their relationship.  Jason arrives, severely beaten as a result of his attempt to prevent Richard from entering earlier, and acknowledges Richard as his master.  Richard feeds from Jason's blood and feeds Jason some of his own blood and power.  Shaken by Richard's display of inhuman behavior, Anita worries that perhaps Richard is right that killing Marcus will mean surrendering too much of his human identity.  After some hesitation, Anita proposes that Richard sleep with her that morning, and that they marry as soon as possible.  Richard refuses, promising to sleep with Anita and to marry her, but only after she sees him as a werewolf.

Anita is awakened by Cassandra leaning over her bed in darkness.  Cassandra apologizes for the fright and explains that Richard and Jean-Claude have a plan.  The men explain that they wish to experiment calling the power that the three of them summoned accidentally in The Lunatic Cafe.  Richard sees the power as a way to force Marcus to back down without a death, and Jean-Claude sees it as a means to secure his control of the city and his safety.  Anita reluctantly agrees to the experiment after forcing Jean-Claude to promise that he will not mark either of the others as his servant.

As the three engage in the initial stages of a ménage à trois, Anita is first uncomfortable, but soon overcome by a combination of lust and magical power.  Acting on instinct, Anita demands blood to complete the ritual, and Jean-Claude bites Richard even as the two men continue seducing Anita.  Anita is flooded with power, and instinctively raises the dead, much as she did when flooded with power by inadvertent human sacrifices in The Laughing Corpse and Bloody Bones.  As Anita makes plans to investigate what she has raised from the dead and where, Richard and Jean-Claude sense an emergency and race her to the location of an old cemetery within the Circus.  Anita learns that she has raised scores of zombies, as well as the resting forms of three vampires: Damian, Liv, and Willie.  The three discuss their relationship some more—Jean-Claude and Richard are threatened by Anita's power and need for dominance, while Anita and Richard are threatened by Jean-Claude's ongoing seduction of them both.  (On the other hand, Cassandra, a post graduate student of magical theory as well as a werewolf, is more clinically interested in the magic than in their relationship).

Unsure whether, after raising them as zombies, Anita will be able to return the vampires to death in a way that allows them to rise as vampires with the setting sun, the group decides to call Dominic Dumare for assistance.  (Anita reveals that a woman alibied Dumare, eliminating him as a suspect in Robert's killing.)  Dominic and Cassandra are both intellectually fascinated by Anita's power to raise vampires, and, at Dominic's request, Anita experiments with the power, learning that she can heal vampires that she raises during daylight.  Dominic helps her develop a ritual to combine her powers with Jean-Claude's and Richards and lay the vampires and zombies to rest, and they agree to try to use the technique to heal Sabin the next day.

Jean-Claude, Richard, and Anita discuss their mutual relationship some more.  Richard has agreed to accept Jean-Claude's marks as his animal servant, but will not accept a subordinate position to either Jean-Claude or Anita, and threatens to kill Jean-Claude if he attempts to assume control.  Anita, for her part, will not even accept the marks.  Jean-Claude claims to be threatened by Anita's new power and by the prospect of a three-way battle for dominance "for all eternity," but he is intrigued by the amount of power the three of them can raise.

Edward arrives, with an assistant, the psychopathic mercenary Harley.  Edward explains that he has learned that Marcus was behind the contract on Anita's life, and Jean-Claude hypothesizes that Marcus wanted to distract Richard from concentrating on that night's battle of succession.  Anita and Richard dress for the battle and leave, with Edward and Harley as backup.  Using Jean-Claude's mark, Anita and Richard unite their three powers once more, this time magnifying Richard's power.  Holding Anita's hand, Richard helps her "ride" his power, allowing the two of them to run through the forest like wolves.

At the wolves' sacred clearing, Richard and Marcus face off.  Sebastian stabs Richard in the back in order to help Marcus, but is killed by Edward, who has taken up a sniper's position nearby.  Without further interference, Richard tears out Marcus's heart, killing him.

In order to prevent her from killing Raina, Richard grabs Anita. He holds her down bodily as he changes to his wolf-man state. He invites Anita to share his power again, but she flees in horror, just as the pack begins eating Marcus. Anita runs back to the Circus and Jean-Claude.  Distraught, Anita finally gives in to Jean-Claude's ongoing seduction, in the first of the many detailed scenes of erotica that Hamilton has since introduced into the series.

The next morning, Richard arrives, and is devastated by the combination Anita's rejection of him the previous night and discovering that she has had sex with Jean-Claude.  After an emotional fight, Richard declares that he will always love Anita and leaves.  Cassandra arrives to help Anita clean up but then, to Anita's surprise, knocks Anita unconscious and delivers her to Raina and Gabriel.

With Anita safely bound on the set of Raina's porn films, Cassandra explains that she, Dominic and Sabin are a triumvirate. Cassandra was the lover who convinced Sabin to give up feeding on humans, causing him to develop his degenerative condition.  Dominic believed that by sacrificing Jean-Claude's triumvirate, they could heal Sabin, and the three of them came to St. Louis to do so. Discovering that Anita was not marked by Jean-Claude, they are going to try the sacrifice with just Jean-Claude and Richard. Anita attempts to reason with Cassandra, and promises to heal Sabin by raising him during daylight the next day.  Cassandra refuses, stating that they do not have even one more day before Sabin loses his mind permanently, and leaves Anita to be raped and killed in Raina's snuff film.

Gabriel, a psychotic sadomasochist, has been fantasizing about arming Anita with silver knives and raping her while she tries to kill him.  Anita talks Gabriel into trying out his fantasy and gives her the knives. Unknown to Gabriel, Anita accepts the first and second vampire marks from Richard and Jean-Claude while waiting for the scene to begin; with her weapons and the extra power from the marks, she is able to kill both Gabriel and Raina. Together with Edward and Harley, Anita races to the sacrifice site to save Jean-Claude and Richard.

At the site, Dominic has prepared another circle of power against the dead, which Anita, a necromancer, is unable to enter.  Edward crosses the circle and kills Dominic to stop his spell but is knocked unconscious by Sabin.  Harley shoots Cassandra. Anita kills Sabin and is then forced to kill Harley, who has lost control without Edward to anchor him to reality.  She rushes to Richard and Jean-Claude and finds Richard dying, his heart pierced by Dominic's blade.  Jean-Claude explains that he is shielding Anita from Richard's pain, and that he and Richard will probably die.  Anita is unable to cope with losing both men and agrees to accept the third mark, giving blood to Jean-Claude and saving Richard and Jean-Claude's lives.

In the epilogue, Anita explains that Monica's baby is doing well, and that she and Jean-Claude remain lovers, but that Richard has frozen them both out of his life, rendering the triumvirate useless.  Even more ominously, Edward has declared that because Anita killed Harley, she now owes him one favor, which he will collect when he sees fit.

Characters

Major characters
The Killing Dance features the following major characters.
 Anita Blake: Anita's primary developments in this novel are romantic, as she attempts, unsuccessfully, to forge a life with Richard, then ultimately selects Jean-Claude.  She also experiences significant political developments, as her developing powers draw her deeper into Jean-Claude's vampire power structure and into the political world of Richard's werewolf pack.
 Jean-Claude: Jean-Claude continues to present something of an enigma.  Although he claims to love Anita, the character of Sabin serves as an example of the danger of absolute love to a vampire, as does Jean-Claude's story of the tragic ending of his love affair with Asher and Julianna.  Although he may well be in love, Anita is well aware that Jean-Claude remains very calculating, and that, as usual, the events of The Killing Dance seem to work out to Jean-Claude's benefit more than anyone else's—by the end of the novel, Anita is Jean-Claude's lover alone, Jean-Claude's rivals, Marcus and Raina are dead, and Anita and Richard are bound to Jean-Claude as his human and animal servants.  
 Richard: This novel underscores Richard's essentially tragic nature.  Although Richard is extraordinarily blessed—phenomenally powerful, fantastically handsome, in requited love with his apparent soulmate—he lacks the essential self-knowledge needed to resolve his crisis.  Richard is unable to integrate his human and werewolf natures, and this tragic flaw haunts him throughout the series.  This novel, where Richard finally reveals his true nature to Anita and is rejected, represents the beginning of a long slide for the character that has yet to resolve.
 Edward: Edward is his typical self—an inscrutable and deadly serial killer.  However, in this novel, he continues to show hints of some other emotional existence.  In particular, his fondness for Anita begins to look something like friendship, and to suggest the possibility of an emotional inner life.

Other characters
Recurring characters in The Killing Dance include:

 Reappearances of RPIT members Dolph Storr, Zerbrowski and the introduction of RPIT's first witch Tammy Reynolds.  As Anita's relationship with Jean-Claude becomes public knowledge and her public death toll rises, Dolph begins to show seeds of the distrust that would manifest between them over the course of the next several novels.
 The reappearance of the vampire Willie McCoy and the introduction of newly arrived vampires Damian and Liv.
 The reappearance of shapeshifters Rafael, Lillian, Christine, Jason and Stephen and the introduction of Stephen's twin brother, the wereleopard Gregory, new pack enforcer Jamil, and pack member Sylvie.
 Miscellaneous other characters, particularly Catherine Maison-Gillette, Mrs. Pringle and Monica Vespucci.

Non-recurring characters include:

 Police detectives Greeley and Branswell.
 Pack members Heidi and Neal.

The death toll in The Killing Dance includes:

 The dark mirror to Anita's own triumvirate: Sabin (shot by Anita); Dominic Dumare (shot by Edward) and Cassandra (shot by Harley and/or died when Anita killed Sabin).
 Jean-Claude's vampire flunky Robert (heart torn out by Dominic).
 Assassins for hire Jimmy "Jimmy the Shotgun" Dugan (a cheap local thug) and "Annabelle Smith" (a pricy international assassin), both killed by Anita.
 Local lycanthropes Sebastian (shot by Edward); Marcus (killed by Richard in battle of succession); Gabriel (stabbed by Anita); and Raina (shot by Anita).
 
 

1997 American novels
American erotic novels
Anita Blake: Vampire Hunter novels
Low fantasy novels
Novels set in St. Louis
Werewolf novels
Ace Books books

de:Tanz der Toten